Catherine Called Birdy is a 2022 medieval comedy film written and directed by Lena Dunham, based on the 1994 novel of the same name by Karen Cushman. It stars Bella Ramsey as the title character, alongside Billie Piper, Andrew Scott, Lesley Sharp, Joe Alwyn, and Sophie Okonedo.

It had its world premiere at the Toronto International Film Festival on September 12, 2022. It received a limited release on September 23, 2022 by Amazon Studios, prior to streaming on Prime Video on October 7, 2022.

Plot

Catherine, known as Birdy, is a 14-year-old Englishwoman living in 13th-century Lincolnshire with her father Rollo, her mother Aislinn, and 17-year-old brother Robert. Her other brother Edward is a monk at a nearby monastery.  The headstrong and rambunctious Birdy is attended by her loyal servant Morwenna, and is friends with a peasant boy named Perkin who often joins in her antics.  The indulgent Rollo is informed that the family finances are in terrible shape and that he can solve them by wedding Birdy to a wealthy suitor.  When Birdy starts her first period, Morwenna shows her how to deal with it and Rollo begins seriously looking for suitors. Aislinn gives birth to a stillborn child, the latest of several such tragedies.

Unwilling to grow up and lose her freedom, Birdy begins chasing off potential suitors through strange and off-putting antics.  Birdy's friend Aelis comes to stay with them.  Handsome Uncle George, with whom Birdy is smitten, soon returns from the crusades.  Birdy discovers Aelis and George kissing, and breaks off her friendship with Aelis. George breaks Aelis' and Birdy's hearts by marrying Ethelfritha, a wealthy widow.  Rollo announces that Aislinn is pregnant again, much to the anger of Birdy, who fears that her mother will die in childbirth.  

A new suitor, Sir Henry Murgaw, arrives, and Birdy dubs him Shaggy Beard for his unkempt appearance.  Birdy attempts to scare away the much older man, but Shaggy Beard finds her antics alluring.  Saying that he "enjoys the chase," he gives Birdy a purse full of money, saying that she should spend it when she agrees to marry him.  Aelis' father marries her off to a 9 year old boy, but her new husband soon dies.  This pleases Robert, who is secretly in love with Aelis and plans to ask her to marry him.  Aelis' father demands a higher bride price than Robert can afford. Birdy decides to give Shaggy Beard's money to Robert so he can marry Aelis.  

Birdy runs off to Uncle George's. There she learns that her romantic notions of George's adventures are false.  Ethelfritha suggests that the two of them run off and have adventures, but Birdy realizes that if she does so she will miss her family and friends.  Resolved to marry for the sake of the family, Birdy returns home to find her mother in labor. When complications arise, Rollo helps talk Aislinn through the labor and she gives birth to twin daughters. The day has finally arrived and Birdy says tearful goodbyes as she prepares to leave with Shaggy Beard. As the carriage  trundles away, Rollo intervenes, and says that Birdy will remain with them.  Shaggy Beard insists that she marry him and the two men agree to a duel.  Rollo ends up disarming Shaggy Beard, who fakes a back injury in order to remove himself from the duel.  The assembled people take Birdy out of the carriage, ending the marriage agreement.

Birdy, who has been keeping a diary of these events, summarizes what she has learned and vows to preserve what freedom she can in her world.  As she roughhouses with Perkin, a suitor approaches on a horse.

Cast
 Bella Ramsey as Lady Catherine / "Birdy"
 Billie Piper as Lady Aislinn, Catherine's mother
 Andrew Scott as Lord Rollo, Catherine's father
 Lesley Sharp as Morwenna, Catherine's nursemaid
 Joe Alwyn as George, Catherine's uncle and Lady Aislinn’s younger brother
 Sophie Okonedo as Ethelfritha Rose Splinter of Devon, a wealthy widow who marries George
 Paul Kaye as Sir John Henry Murgaw VIII / "Shaggy Beard"
 Dean-Charles Chapman as Robert, Catherine's 17-year-old older brother
 Isis Hainsworth as Aelis, Catherine's best friend
 Archie Renaux as Edward the Monk, Catherine's 21-year-old older brother
 Michael Woolfitt, as Perkin, Catherine's goatherd friend
 David Bradley as Lord Gideon Sidebottom, Aelis' father
 Mimi M. Khayisa as Lady Berenice Sidebottom, Aelis' stepmother
 Rita Bernard-Shaw as Meg, Catherine's milkmaid friend
 Ralph Ineson as Golden Tiger, a peasant and driver
 Jamie Demetriou as Etienne, the manservant to Shaggy Beard
 Russell Brand as Suitor from Kent
 Jacob Avery as Fulk the Younger
 Angus Wright as Fulk the Elder

Production
In February 2021, it was announced that Dunham had scripted and would direct a film based on the children's novel Catherine, Called Birdy by Karen Cushman that was "her longtime passion project". At the end of March 2021, it was announced that Billie Piper, Andrew Scott and Bella Ramsey were included in the main cast. On 1 April 2021, it was reported that Joe Alwyn and Dean-Charles Chapman had joined the cast.

Principal photography began on 30 March 2021 in close proximity to Stokesay Castle in Shropshire, England.

Release
The film had its world premiere at the Toronto International Film Festival in September 2022. It was released in a limited release on September 23, 2022, by Amazon Studios, prior to streaming on Prime Video on October 7, 2022.

Reception
On the review aggregator Rotten Tomatoes, 88% of 127 critics' reviews are positive, with an average rating of 7.2/10. The website's consensus reads, "Bringing a beloved book brilliantly to life, Catherine Called Birdy proves a well-told coming-of-age story can feel fresh regardless of the period setting." On Metacritic, the film has a weighted average score of 74 out of 100, based on 34 critics, indicating "generally favorable reviews". David Fear with Rolling Stone said the film was "the perfect mix of funny, irreverent and outraged," calling Dunham's adaptation "deliriously fun yet pointed," and lead actress Ramsey "a gift from the casting gods." Giving the film four out of five stars, Adrian Horton with The Guardian acknowledged that "the midsection drags a bit," but concluded that "in Dunham’s hands, the throughline of enduring and discovering one’s worth, however historically imagined, is at once a comfort and a lark."

References

External links
 

2020s English-language films
2020s historical comedy films
Amazon Studios films
American historical comedy films
British historical comedy films
Films based on American novels
Films based on children's books
Films directed by Lena Dunham
Films scored by Carter Burwell
Films set in medieval England
Films shot in Shropshire
Working Title Films films
2020s American films
2020s British films
Films shot at Pinewood Studios